The Sounding is a 2017 American mystery drama film directed by and starring Catherine Eaton.  It is Eaton's feature directorial debut. The film premiered at the 2017 Cinequest Film Festival.

Cast
Catherine Eaton
Teddy Sears
Harris Yulin
Erin Darke
Frankie Faison

Release
The film was released via VOD on October 20, 2020.

Reception
The film has a 69% rating on Rotten Tomatoes.  Tomris Laffly of RogerEbert.com awarded the film two stars.  Kate Erbland of IndieWire graded the film a B.

Frank Scheck of The Hollywood Reporter gave the film a negative review and wrote, "The Sounding might have worked better as a theater piece — which is how it began — than as a film, where its excessive quirkiness feels all the more glaring."

References

External links
 
 

2017 films
2017 drama films
American mystery drama films
2010s English-language films
2010s American films